Tkvarcheli District is one of the districts of Abkhazia. It has no equivalent Georgian district, as it was newly formed in 1995 from parts of Ochamchira District and Gali District, centered on its eponymous capital, Tkvarcheli. The population of the district was 14,477 at the time of the 2003 census. By the 2011 census, it had increased to 16,012. Of note is Bedia Cathedral located within the district.

Demographics
At the time of the 2011 census, the population of the district was 16,012. The ethnic composition of the population was as follows:
Georgians (62.05%)
Abkhaz (32.0%)
Russians (3.4%)
Ukrainians (0.4%)
Armenians (0.3%)
Greeks (0.1%)

Economy

The coal-mining carried out by the  Turkish Tamsaş company is the district's main industry and source of income as Tamsaş's tax payments account for 75% of its budget. The company was criticised for neglecting environmental requirements. Construction of a new cement plant is planned now, its output to be used for the Olympic construction projects in Sochi.

Administration
Valeri Kharchilava was reappointed as Administration Head on 10 May 2001 following the March 2001 local elections.

On 27 March 2003, Kharchilava announced at a meeting of the Cabinet of Ministers that he wanted to resign. On 31 March 2003, First Deputy Minister for Foreign Affairs Daur Arshba was appointed the new Administration Head.

On 22 March 2005, newly elected President Sergei Bagapsh dismissed Daur Arshba and appointed Timur Gogua in his stead. On 23 February 2007, before the local elections, President Bagapsh temporarily prolonged Timur Gogua's tenure as Head of the District Administration. After Gogua was re-elected to the District Assembly, he was permanently re-appointed on 21 March.

On 2 June 2014, following the 2014 Abkhazian political crisis, acting President Valeri Bganba dismissed Timur Gogua, as had been demanded by protesters, and appointed his Deputy Zurab Argunia as acting District Head. Following the election of Raul Khajimba as President, he on 3 November appointed Aida Chachkhalia as District Head in Argunia's stead.

List of Administration Heads

Settlements
The district's main settlements are:
Tkvarcheli

References

 
Districts of Abkhazia